Dino Martinović (born 20 July 1990) is a Slovenian footballer who plays as a midfielder.

Biography
Born in Karlovac, Croatia (at that time part of SFR Yugoslavia), Martinović started his career at Krka's youth selections. Between 2005 and 2007, he was a member of youth teams at Croatian club Dinamo Zagreb.

Gorica
Martinović was signed by Gorica in August 2007, but was immediately loaned back to Krka. Martinović made his debut for Gorica in the 2009–10 Slovenian PrvaLiga. In January 2010 he was loaned to Krško. In August 2010 he was signed by Bela Krajina on a half-year loan. In July 2011 Martinović left for Adria. However, he returned to Gorica in the same transfer window.

Martinović played four games in the 2012–13 Slovenian PrvaLiga before he left the club in August 2012. Martinović was in the starting eleven on 4 August 2012, in his last game for Gorica.

Verona
Martinović was signed by Serie B club Verona in August 2012.

On 31 August 2012 he was signed by the third division side AlbinoLeffe. On 22 August 2013 he was signed by Paganese, also in the third division.

On 29 January 2014, Martinović joined the Swiss Challenge League side Lugano on a loan. In summer 2014 he was released by Verona.

Lokomotiv Plovdiv
On 12 January 2017, Martinović signed a one-and-a-half-year contract with Bulgarian club Lokomotiv Plovdiv.

References

External links
 
 PrvaLiga profile 

1990 births
Living people
Sportspeople from Karlovac
Slovenian footballers
Association football midfielders
Slovenian expatriate footballers
Slovenian PrvaLiga players
NK Krka players
ND Gorica players
NK Krško players
Expatriate footballers in Italy
Slovenian expatriate sportspeople in Italy
Serie C players
Hellas Verona F.C. players
U.C. AlbinoLeffe players
Paganese Calcio 1926 players
Expatriate footballers in Switzerland
FC Lugano players
PFC Lokomotiv Plovdiv players
FC Vereya players
SFC Etar Veliko Tarnovo players
First Professional Football League (Bulgaria) players
Expatriate footballers in Bulgaria
Slovenian expatriate sportspeople in Bulgaria
Slovenia youth international footballers
Slovenian people of Croatian descent